Marta Mika (born 8 July 1983) is a Polish football defender currently playing for Unia Racibórz in the Ekstraliga. She previously played for Gol Częstochowa and Mitech Żywiec.

She is a member of the Polish national team since 2007.

References

1983 births
Living people
Place of birth missing (living people)
Polish women's footballers
Women's association football defenders
RTP Unia Racibórz players
TS Mitech Żywiec players
Polish expatriate footballers
Polish expatriate sportspeople in Germany
Expatriate women's footballers in Germany